Corporate contract pilot is a classification of pilot in general aviation.  A corporate pilot is classified as a pilot who flies private business aircraft.  A corporate pilot can be type-rated or certified in multiple types of business aircraft and may fly Part 135 and Part 91 of the Federal Aviation Regulations. A corporate contract pilot is a corporate pilot that flies on a contract basis. 

A salary survey of over 500 Corporate contract pilots showed salaries varying  anywhere from $250 per day on a light jet, up to $1500 per day on the Gulfstream G550 and Global Express aircraft.

References

External links 
 FlyContract – A lot of corporate contract pilot information
 FlightSafety International – Corporate pilot training facility
 CAE Simuflite – Corporate pilot training facility
 CrewBlast - Contract Pilot and Contract Flight Attendant Information

Transport occupations